Strawberry Fire may refer to:

 Strawberry Fire (2016), a Nevada wildfire
 Strawberry Fire (2017), a Montana wildfire